

The Arado SSD I was a biplane fighter seaplane developed in Germany in 1930, intended to be launched from catapults on warships. This was an all-new design from Walter Rethel, sharing nothing with his other fighter designs for Arado of the late 1920s. It was a conventional unequal-span, staggered biplane, with the slightly gulled top wing attached to the upper fuselage. It was equipped with a single, large float under the fuselage and two outrigger floats near the wingtips. After evaluation at Travemünde, the floats were removed and a simple, wheeled undercarriage was fitted for competitive evaluation with the Heinkel HD 38 at Lipetsk. The Heinkel was selected, and the SSD I was relegated to trainer duties with the LVS in 1932.

Specifications

References

 
 World Aircraft Information Files. Brightstar Publishing, London. File 889 Sheet 74
 German Aircraft  between 1919 - 1945

1930s German fighter aircraft
Floatplanes
SSD I
Single-engined tractor aircraft
Biplanes